Education outreach is a variation of Cause Marketing and/or Strategic Philanthropy and other focused Public Affairs activities that are specific to education. These programs may include:

Community events that occur in local venues or online; 
Awareness, skill-building, and/or behavior-changing lesson plans, activities and/or classroom supplements; 
Volunteer opportunities
Direct mail, advertising, online marketing, and public relations
Student or community-based contests and awards (e.g. Global Challenge Award)
Corporate - non-profit partnerships

While Cause Marketing or Strategic Philanthropy may focus on any pro-social topic or initiative, Education Outreach focuses chiefly on enhancing and improving education in schools, homes and communities. And like its siblings, an overarching goal (or in some cases merely a side benefit) of Education Outreach is to marry social (educational) benefits with benefits specific to the sponsor of a given Education Outreach campaign/program. Those sponsor benefits include reinforcing brand identity, nurturing community goodwill, and fulfilling other corporation/organizational missions. Often these sponsors are large, publicly traded companies (Fortune 1000), but non-profit organizations, government entities, and trade associations also participate and sponsor Education Outreach programs.

Philosophy of education